James Durkan (14 July 1915 – 1990) was a Scottish professional footballer who played as a defender.

Career
Durkan began his career with King's Park in his native Scotland before joining Cardiff City in 1933. He made six league appearances for the club before being released at the end of the season, finishing his professional career with Bristol Rovers.

References

1915 births
1990 deaths
Scottish footballers
King's Park F.C. players
Cardiff City F.C. players
Bristol Rovers F.C. players
English Football League players
Association football fullbacks